Noaman Sami (born 19 October 1990) is a Pakistani actor who works in Urdu television. His works include Main Haar Nahi Manoun Gi, Daldal, Help Me Durdana. In 2019, he made his film debut with Talash which was critically praised. In 2020, He was seen playing a leading role of Shahmeer in Mera Dil Mera Dushman.

Personal life 

Sami was in relationship with actress, Alizeh Shah but they broke up in October, 2020.

He along with other cast of Mera Dil Mera Dushman was allegedly tested positive for COVID-19 during the COVID-19 pandemic on 20 May 2020 and after the period of one month continue shoot for the series.

Television

Special appearance

Film

Awards and nominations

References

External links

Living people
Pakistani male television actors
1990 births